Ray T. Wilson (born 8 April 1947 in Grangemouth) is a Scottish former football full-back.

An amateur with Woodburn Athletic he joined West Bromwich Albion on the same terms in 1963, turning professional a year later. Initially playing on the left side of midfield he soon settled into the left full-back position, dislodging Graham Williams with his hard tackling. A regular at left-back for a number of years, he suffered a shattered kneecap against Luton Town in August 1975 and was forced into early retirement as a consequence. He was awarded a testimonial game against Aston Villa the same year.

Following his retirement Wilson settled in Birmingham where he became a businessman.

References

1947 births
Living people
Scottish footballers
West Bromwich Albion F.C. players
People from Grangemouth
Association football fullbacks
Footballers from Falkirk (council area)
Scotland under-23 international footballers
English Football League players